Valter Wredberg is a Swedish sprint canoer who competed in the mid-1950s. He won a silver medal in the K-2 500 m event at the 1954 ICF Canoe Sprint World Championships in Mâcon.

References

Living people
Swedish male canoeists
Year of birth missing (living people)
ICF Canoe Sprint World Championships medalists in kayak